Acrocercops imperfecta is a moth of the family Gracillariidae. It is known from Egypt.

References

imperfecta
Moths described in 1960
Endemic fauna of Egypt
Moths of Africa